The Alliance of Rabbis in Islamic States is a union of rabbis residing in Muslim countries, established in December 2019 to support Jewish life in the region.

Its activity is approved by Chief Rabbi of Israel Grand Rabbi Yitzchak Yosef and follows his Halachic directives.

Structure and offices 
Rabbi Mendy Chitrik, Head Rabbi of Istanbul Ashkenazi Jewish community was elected as chairman.

The alliance represents rabbis of all Jewish backgrounds Sefardi, Ashkenazi, Chabad and communal rabbis, who live in Albania, Azerbaijan, Morocco, Nigeria, Turkey, Tunisia, Iran, Kazakhstan, Kosovo, Kyrgyzstan, UAE, Uganda, Uzbekistan among others.

Rabbis serving in communities of other Muslim majority regions, such as North Cyprus and the Russian republics of Tatarstan and Bashkortostan, are also represented. There are currently 40 members of the Alliance of Rabbis and they live permanently in the Muslim world.

There are other regional rabbinical organizations, such as the Rabbinical Council of America, the Conference of European Rabbis and Rabbinical Center of Europe, however, this is the first such organization based in the Islamic world.

The organization's first summit was held in Istanbul on December 22, 2021.   The meeting was also attended by Turkish president Recep Tayyip Erdoğan.

Presidium council 
The Presidium Council of the union consists of:

 Rabbi Shimon Elituv, representing the Council of the Chief Rabbinate of Israel
 Rabbi Gad Bouskila, Rabbi of Congregation Netivot Yisrael Moroccan community Brooklyn NY
 Rabbi Rafael David Banon, Beth Din of Montreal, Moroccan community Montreal
 Rabbi Haim Bitan, chief rabbi of Tunisia

 Rabbi Isak Haleva, Hahambaşı chief Rabbi of Turkey. 

 Rabbi Avraham Hamra, the last chief rabbi of Syria was a member of the Presidium Council until his death in 2021.

Executive board 

 Levi Bannon, Chabad rabbi in Casablanca
 Mendy Chitrik, Ashkenazi rabbi from Turkey
 Yeshaya Cohen, Chief Rabbi of Kazakhstan
 Levi Duchman, Rabbi from the UAE
 Shneor Segal, Leader of the Ashkenazi community of Azerbaijan
 Yisrael Uzan, Chief Rabbi of Nigeria

Activities 
The alliance aims to advise governments and other organizations on all matters of coexistence, tolerance, and peace. It supports the work of rabbis and community leaders as well as continues Jewish life and culture in Muslim countries.

The main task is also to take care of isolated individuals and communities in Muslim world.

Rabbis are involved in calls for interfaith and peaceful living with Muslims.

Alliance of Rabbis in Islamic States also provided humanitarian aid for needy families in Nigeria prior to Ramadan and were involved on rescuing Zebulun Simintob from Kabul, Afghanistan after the Taliban took over the city in 2021.

External links

References 

Jewish religious organizations
International Jewish organizations
Judaism-related lists
Rabbinical organizations
Rabbis by organisation
Jewish interfaith organizations
Islamic and Jewish interfaith dialogue
Jews and Judaism in the Arab world
Jewish organizations established in 2019